Paradrina rebeli is a moth of the family Noctuidae. The species was first described by Otto Staudinger in 1901. It is endemic to the Canary Islands. Some authors consider the genus Paradrina to be a subgenus of Caradrina, hence the species is also known as Caradrina rebeli or Caradrina (Paradrina) rebeli.

The moth flies year round.

The larvae feed on various herbaceous plants.

References

External links
"Paradrina rebeli (Staudinger, 1901)". Lepidoptera and their Ecology

Hadeninae
Owlet moths of Africa